Longstaffbreen is a glacier in Ny-Friesland at Spitsbergen, Svalbard. It is a branch from the ice areas of Åsgardfonna and Valhallfonna, and the glacier debouches into the lake of Femmilsjøen. The glacier is named after Arctic explorer and mountaineer Tom George Longstaff.

References

Glaciers of Spitsbergen